Okoneshnikovsky District is an administrative and municipal district (raion), one of the thirty-two in Omsk Oblast, Russia. It is located in the southeast of the oblast. Its administrative center is the urban locality (a work settlement) of Okoneshnikovo. Population: 14,791 (2010 Census);  The population of Okoneshnikovo accounts for 35.2% of the district's total population.

References

Notes

Sources

Districts of Omsk Oblast